Jeļena Ostapenko was the defending champion, but chose not to participate this year.

Amy Bowtell won the title, defeating Tess Sugnaux in the final, 6–2, 6–3.

Seeds

Main draw

Finals

Top half

Bottom half

References 
 Main draw

Orto-Laakarit Open - Singles
2014 WS